Flor marchita ("Wilted Flower") is a 1969 Mexican film. It stars Sara García.

Cast

External links
 

1969 films
Mexican drama films
1960s Spanish-language films
Films directed by Rogelio A. González
1960s Mexican films